Pierre Perret (born 9 July 1934 in Castelsarrasin, Tarn-et-Garonne) is a French singer and composer. Pierre Perret resides in the city of Nangis.

Biography 
He spent a long part of his childhood in the café which his parents owned, where he learned to work with jargon and slang.
At the age of 14 he signed up to the conservatoire de musique de Toulouse and to a dramatic arts institute. But he wasn't admitted to the Conservatoire national supérieur de musique et de danse de Paris because he had some problems with military justice during his military service. In the meantime, he set up his first band of four musicians in his own name, with whom he played at events throughout the region. In 1957, he was snapped up by Eddie Barclay who signed him on. It was in the studio of Barclay where he met his future wife, Simone Mazaltarim.

In 1958, Perret carried on touring round Parisian cabaret bars and crossed France and Africa as a part of the American group, The Platters. In November that year, a pleurisy forced him to take two years off in a sanatorium.

A master of the subtleties of the French language and French slang (he even rewrote some of Jean de La Fontaine's fables), his songs are often cheeky (for example Le zizi (The willy), asking questions in a seemingly naive child's tone, but has written more serious political songs, such as La bête est revenue, La petite kurde, Vert de Colère or Lily.

In 1995, he recorded in duet with Sophie Darel the French song Maître Pierre for the album C'était les Années Bleues.

He participated in the committee for the simplification of the administrative language (COSLA).

Discography

Albums

Studio albums
1957 : Moi j'attends Adèle
1958 : 1 (dont 5 titres de l'album précédent)
1960 : Joséphine
1964 : Le Tord-Boyaux
1965 : Mon Petit Amour
1968 : Enregistré en public à L'Olympia
1970 : Cuvée 71
1971 : La Cage aux Oiseaux
1973 : Le Plombier
1973 : En public
1974 : Le Zizi
1976 : Celui d'Alice
1977 : Lily
1979 : Mon P'tit Loup
1979 : À Bobino
1981 : C'est l'Printemps !
1983 : Comment c'est la Chine ?
1984 : Bobino 84 (double album)
1986 : Irène !
1987 : Chansons buissonnières (Interdit aux plus de 12 ans) (with Chanson de la bande à B.D.)
1987 : Pierrot à l'Olympia (double album)
1989 : Ce soir c'est fête – Coeur cabossé
1992 : Bercy Madeleine
1994 : Récital du Casino de Paris (double CD)
1995: Chante 20 fables inspirées de Jean de La Fontaine – Versions Pierrot
1995 : Chansons Éroticoquines (rereleased in 1999 with 4 new bonus tracks)
1997 : Casino de Paris (double CD)
1998 : La Bête est Revenue
2002 : Çui-là
2005 : Live au Casino de Paris (CD + DVD)
2006 : Mélangez-vous
2007 : Le Plaisir des Dieux – Anthologie de la chanson paillarde
2008 : Les Dieux Paillards (double CD)
2010 : La Femme Grillagée
2014 : Drôle de poésie!
2015 : Mes femmes

Compilation albums
1967 : Les deux visages de Pierre Perret (compilation + 3 new tracks including "Les postières" with vocals by Nicole Croisille)
1975 : 15 ans de chansons (6 albums set, 72 tracks including 39 rerecorded in 1975)
1994 : Pierrot l'intégrale (9 CDs for period 1970–1992, with 5 new tracks of the year 1992)
2007 : 50 ans de chansons (à l'Olympia) (2 CDs including 38 live tracks + DVD)
2011 : L'intégrale (29 CDs + 1 DVD)
2013 : L'âge de Pierre (3 CDs)

Songs 
1963: "Le tord boyaux"
1963: "La corrida"
1963: "Pépé la jactance"
1966: "Les jolies colonies de vacances"
1967: "Tonton Cristobal"
1967: "Marcel"
1967: "Mimi la douce"
1967: "Blanche"
1970: "Fillette le bonheur c'est toujours pour demain"
1971: "Dépêche-toi mon amour"
1971: "La cage aux oiseaux"
1971: "La grande ourse"
1971: "Ma femme"
1971: "Olga"
1973: "Françouèse"
1974: "À poil:"
1974: "Le Zizi"
1974: "L'infidèle"
1974: "Ma p'tite Julia"
1976: "Ma nouvelle adresse"
1976: "Vaisselle cassée"
1977: "Lily"
1977: "Au Café du Canal"
1979: "Estelle"
1979: "L'hôpital"
1979: "Mon p'tit loup"
1981: "Y'a cinquante gosses dans l'escalier"
1986: "Nos amies les bêtes"
1989: "Riz pilé"
1992: "Bercy Madeleine"
1992: "La petite Kurde"
1998: "La bête est revenue"
2011: "La femme grillagee"

Books 
 1982: Le Petit Perret illustré par l'exemple (dictionnaire de l’argot); Livre de Poche, nouvelle édition, 1985
 1992: Laissez chanter le petit (biographie)
 1996: La cuisine de ma femme
 2000: Anthologie de la poésie érotique
 2003: Le parler des métiers (vocabulaire de 145 professions)
 2005: Le Café du Pont : Parfums d'enfance (autobiographie)
 2007: Les Petits Métiers d’Atget à Willy Ronis, éditions Hoëbeke
 2007: Le Perret gourmand, éditions Le cherche midi
 2008: A capella, éditions Le cherche midi

Television

"Capitaine Marleau", French television crime drama series; 
(2018, Season 1 Episode 12, 23 October, "Double Jeu", "Double Dealing", as Monsieur Pellison); https://en.wikipedia.org/wiki/Capitaine_Marleau

References

External links 

  Official site
 Le Café du Pont (2010); biographical film at the IMDB.

1934 births
Living people
People from Castelsarrasin
Commandeurs of the Ordre des Arts et des Lettres
20th-century French male singers
21st-century French male singers